Edvard Henrik Carleson (16 November 1820 – 1 April 1884) was a Councilor of Justice and a Councilor of State of the Kingdom of Sweden, etc., son of Jacob Edvard Carleson, Lieutenant Colonel of the Swedish Army, and wife Liboria Fredrika Eleonora Harmens.

Family and children
He married in 1863 Marie Louise Aurore Arfwedson (18 August 1846 -). They had at least one daughter, Anna Elisabeth Aurore Carleson (5 November 1867 -), married on 20 November 1886 to Oscar Carl Gustav Ankarcrona (10 June 1857 -), Huntsman-Major of the Court of the King of Sweden, Major of the Swedish Army, etc., and had issue.

References

1823 births
1912 deaths
Swedish Ministers for Justice
Swedish nobility
19th-century Swedish politicians